Setaria sphacelata is a tall African grass, also known as South African pigeon grass and African bristlegrass. It is native to tropical and subtropical Africa, and is extensively cultivated globally as a pasture grass and for cut fodder.  This is a rhizomatous perennial grass producing flattened, hairless, blue-green stems up to 2 m tall. The inflorescence is a dense, narrow panicle of bristly, orange-tinged spikelets up to 25 cm long.

In Africa, Setaria sphacelata seed heads are an important food source for several bird species, including the long-tailed widowbird.

Commercial cultivars have been developed for various climates and soil conditions. All cultivars are high in oxalate, making them generally unsuitable for horses. Recognised pests in cultivation include the buffel grass seed caterpillar (Mampava rhodoneura) and the fungus Pyricularia trisa.

Setaria sphacelata is a good quality forage for ruminants such as cattle, sheep and goats. It can be fed fresh and ensiled.

Setaria sphacelata has become naturalised in many countries and is a significant environmental weed in three Australian states.

References

External links
USDA Plants Profile
FAO

sphacelata
Grasses of Africa
Flora of Southern Africa
Grasses of South Africa
Forages
Flora of Nigeria